The 1990 Lafayette Leopards football team was an American football team that represented Lafayette College during the 1990 NCAA Division I-AA football season. The Leopards finished second-to-last in the newly renamed Patriot League. 

In their tenth year under head coach Bill Russo, the Leopards compiled a 4–7 record. Art Bittel and Tom Costello were the team captains.

The Leopards were outscored 318 to 223. Their 1–4 conference record placed fifth in the six-team Patriot League standings. This was the first year of competition under the Patriot League banner; the league had been known as the Colonial League since 1986.

Lafayette played its home games at Fisher Field on College Hill in Easton, Pennsylvania.

Schedule

References

Lafayette
Lafayette Leopards football seasons
Lafayette Leopards football